Isidor Sauers (born 1948) is an Austrian-born American who is a physicist at the Oak Ridge National Laboratory in Tennessee. He is a specialist on the properties of Sulfur hexafluoride (SF6), with an important patent and over 60 peer-reviewed academic papers.

Papers
His most notable paper, "Electron Attachment to the perfluoroalkanes" in Journal of Chemical Physics 78 (12) 7200-7216 has been cited 88 times since its publication in 1983.

Patent

In the early 1980s, Sauers developed a novel method by which to measure the degradation of Sulfur hexafluoride (SF6) in high-voltage systems. SF6, a hypervalent molecule, is used as a gaseous insulator in conjunction with solid insulating material in high voltage systems such as transmission lines, substations and switchgear. When the dielectric strength of SF6 is exceeded, regions of high electrical stress can cause nearby gas to partially ionize and begin conducting, forming toxic products like SOF2 or S2F10. This method allows scientists to detect the toxic by-products of SF6 breakdown at very low concentrations (ppb) using an ion-molecule reaction cell and a negative ion mass spectrometer, as opposed to conventional methods such as electron impact mass spectrometry (MS), gas chromatography (GC) with thermal conductivity detection, gas chromatography with electron capture detection, or a combination of gas chromatography and mass spectrometry.

See also
Circuit breaker
International Electrotechnical Commission (IEC)
Dielectric strength
Dielectric constant

References
US Patent 4,633,082 - Process for measuring degradation of sulfur hexafluoride in high voltage systems

1948 births
Living people
Austrian emigrants to the United States
20th-century American inventors
21st-century American physicists
American skeptics